Arapi may refer to:

Arapi, Armenia, town in Armenia
Maja e Arapit, mountain in Albania

People
Renato Arapi, Albanian footballer
Florenc Arapi (footballer), Albanian footballer